City Polytechnic Institute, Khulna is the largest and first non-government polytechnic institute in Khulna, Bangladesh.

History 
In early 2003, the Ford Foundation established City Polytechnic Institute, Khulna with a duration of 4 years long courses, based on the syllabus of BTEB.

Academics

Faculties and departments

This institution offers a Diploma in Engineering, Diploma in Textile Technology and six-month short courses under the Bangladesh Technical Education Board.

Diploma in Engineering
 Computer Technology
 Electronics Technology
 Electrical Technology
 Civil Technology
 Telecommunication Technology
 Mechanical Technology
 Marine Technology

Diploma in Textile Technology
 Textile Technology
 Garments Design and Pattern Making Technology

Six-month short courses
 Computer Office Application
 Database Programming

See also
 Dhaka Polytechnic Institute

References

External links
 

Polytechnic institutes in Bangladesh
Education in Khulna
Education in Bangladesh